Ressa Kania Dewi (born 15 September 1994) is an Indonesian swimmer. She competed in the women's 200 metre freestyle event at the 2017 World Aquatics Championships held in Budapest, Hungary.

In 2018, she competed in the women's 200 metre freestyle, 800 metre freestyle and 1500 metre freestyle events at the 2018 Asian Games held in Jakarta, Indonesia. She also competed in the women's 200 metre individual medley and 400 metre individual medley events. She also represented Indonesia in two relay events: the women's 4 × 100 metre freestyle relay and 4 × 200 metre freestyle relay events.

References

1994 births
Living people
Indonesian female swimmers
Place of birth missing (living people)
Swimmers at the 2018 Asian Games
Southeast Asian Games medalists in swimming
Southeast Asian Games silver medalists for Indonesia
Southeast Asian Games bronze medalists for Indonesia
Competitors at the 2017 Southeast Asian Games
Asian Games competitors for Indonesia
Indonesian female freestyle swimmers
Female medley swimmers
Competitors at the 2021 Southeast Asian Games
21st-century Indonesian women